A single human poll represents the 1976–77 AIAW Division I women's basketball rankings, the AP Poll, in addition to various publications' preseason polls. The women's basketball poll began during the 1976–1977 season, and was initially compiled by Mel Greenberg and published by The Philadelphia Inquirer. At first, it was a poll of coaches conducted via telephone, where coaches identified top teams and a list of the Top 20 team was produced. The initial list of coaches did not include Pat Summitt, who asked to join the group, not to improve her rankings, but because of the lack of media coverage, Summitt believed it would be a good way to stay on top of who the top teams were outside of her own schedule. The contributors continued to be coaches until 1994, when the AP took over administration of the poll from Greenberg, and switched to a panel of writers. 

The AP poll is currently a poll of sportswriters. The AP conducts polls weekly through the end of the regular season and conference play.

Legend

AP Poll
Source

References

College women's basketball rankings in the United States